is a leading case in English tort law. It is a House of Lords decision on negligence and marked the start of a rapid expansion in the scope of negligence in the United Kingdom by widening the circumstances in which a court was likely to find a duty of care. The case also addressed the liability of government bodies, a person's liability for the acts of third parties that he has facilitated, and liability for omissions.

Facts
On 21 September 1962, ten borstal trainees were working on Brownsea Island in Poole Harbour under the control of three officers employed by the Home Office. Seven trainees escaped one night, at the time the officers had retired to bed leaving the trainees to their own devices. The seven trainees who escaped boarded a yacht and collided with another yacht, the property of the respondents, and damaged it. The owners of the yacht sued the Home Office in negligence for damages.

A preliminary issue was ordered to be tried on whether the officers or the Home Office owed a duty of care to the claimants (plaintiffs, before the Civil Procedure Rules of 1999) capable of giving rise to liability in damages. It was admitted that the Home Office would be vicariously liable if an action would lie against any of the officers. The preliminary hearing found for the Dorset Yacht Co. that there was, in law, a duty of care and that the case could go forward for trial on its facts. The Home Office appealed to the House of Lords. The Home Office argued that it could owe no duty of care as there was no precedent for any duty on similar facts. Further, it was argued that there could be no liability for the actions of a third party and that the Home Office should be immune from legal action owing to the public nature of its duties.

Judgment

Court of Appeal
Lord Denning MR held that the Home Office should be liable for the damage on grounds of public policy. He stated,

House of Lords
The highest court held 4–1 likewise. Lord Reid held,

Viscount Dilhorne gave a dissenting judgment.

Significance
The case is perhaps relevant not only for its clear elucidation of the 1930s-established Atkinian notion of neighbourhood (a proximity or sufficient nexus) but also for its expression of a thoroughly incrementalist approach to the development of the duty of care. Lord Reid held:

‘there has been a steady trend toward regarding the law of negligence as depending on principle so that when a new point emerges one should ask not whether it is covered by authority but whether recognised principles apply to it. Donoghue v Stevenson may be regarded as a milestone, and the well-known passage in Lord Atkin’s piece should I think be regarded as a statement of principle … it ought to apply unless there is some justification or valid explanation for its exclusion. For example, causing economic loss is a different matter’

See also
English tort law

Notes

References
C Booth and D Squires, The Negligence Liability of Public Authorities (OUP 2006) 
Law Commission, Administrative Redress: Public bodies and the Citizen - A Consultation Paper (2008) LC/187
M Lunney and K Oliphant, Tort Law:Text and Materials (2nd edn OUP 2003) 
C McIvor, Third Party Liability in Tort (Hart 2006, 17–20)

House of Lords cases
1970 in British law
English tort case law
1970 in case law
Home Office litigation
History of Dorset
Poole Harbour